See Government of Colombia for a broader perspective of Colombian government.

Taxation in Colombia is determined by the Congress of Colombia, every Department Assembly and every City Council, which determine what kind of taxes can be levied and which rates can be applied.
The country inherited a harsh and diffused taxation policy from the Spanish Empire characterized by a heavy reliance on customs duties.

National taxes 

National taxes are administered by the National Directorate of Taxes and Customs (DIAN). Some of these taxes include:

VAT
The value-added tax (VAT) is the main indirect tax. This rose to 19 percent in 2017; up to the end of 2016 the tax was 16 percent of the price of merchandise, goods and services with some exceptions: public transportation, water supply and sanitation and the transportation of natural gas and hydrocarbons. The DIAN recognizes two separate categories (regimenes) of VAT: common and simplified.  The first refers to businesses with estimated patrimony over 68 million Colombian pesos (about 34,000 USD), and the second refers to those with patrimony less than that. Although both are obligated to pay the same percentage, the simplified taxpayers are not obligated to conduct separate bookkeeping for the VAT or to generate invoices.

Financial transactions tax
A 0.4% tax rate is imposed on all financial transactions, including withdraw money from ATM, promissory notes, wire transfers, internet banking, bank drafts and bank checks, money on term deposit, overdrafts, installment loans, securities underwriting commitments and other forms of off-balance sheet exposures, safekeeping of documents and other items in safe deposit boxes, currency exchange or unit trusts.

Patrimony tax
This tax requires the annual payment of 1% of the total patrimony of people with patrimony estimated over 5 thousand million pesos (about 1,4 million USD as of February 2021).

Income tax
Corporations: Income tax must be paid by all local and foreign corporations operating in Colombia, who are subject to a corporate tax of 30%.
Individuals: Colombian citizens and foreign nationals who have lived in Colombia for more than 183 days total in any 365 day period not necessarily a calendar year, are considered to be tax residents (residentes fiscales) and are thereafter subject to individual Income tax based on a system of graduated marginal tax rates.

The table below shows the tax rate in units of UVT (Unidad de Valor Tributario), in which 1 UVT = $33,156 COP for 2018. See UVT.
{| class="wikitable"
|-
! Income Range in UVT !! Tax Rate
|-
| 0 to 1,400 || 0%
|-
|>1,400 to 1,700 || 19%
|-
|>1,700 to 4,100 || 28%
|-
| >4,100 || 33%
|}

Income declaration 
In Colombia the natural persons who must present income declaration are classified on the next table.
{| class="wikitable"
|-
! Requisites !! Amount in UVT
|-
| 
 Natural person with gross asset value 
|| >4500
|-
|
 gross revenue
 incomes upper 3,868,166 COP /monthly or Earnings 
 Consumes and purchases 
 If consumes through credit card
 If cumulative value of banking deposits, wire transfer or financial investment 
|| >1400
|}

For 2019 are:
 Natural person with gross asset value upper $149,202,000 COP. (4500 UVT)
 Natural persons with gross revenue upper $46,418,000 COP per year. (1400 UVT)
 Natural person with incomes upper 3,868,166 COP /monthly (Earnings $46,418,000 per year). (1400 UVT)
 Consumes and purchases upper $46,418,000 (1400 UVT)
 If consumes through credit card exceeds $46,418,000 (1400 UVT)
 If cumulative value of banking deposits, wire transfer or financial investment, exceeds $46,418,000 COP. (1400 UVT)

See UVT.

Payroll taxes 
Both the employer and the employee are subject to monthly payroll taxes from the employee's gross salary, as follows:
 Employer:
 Health plan - 8.5%
 Occupational risk - 0.348% - 8.7%
 ICFB (Instituto Colombiano de Bienestar Familiar; Family Welfare) - 3%
 CAJA (Cajas de compensación familiar; Family compensation funds) - 4%
 SENA (National Occupational Training Service) - 2%
 Pension fund - 12%
 Vacation - 4.17%
 Employee:
 Health plan - 4%
 Pension fund - 4%

Local taxes 
The local taxes are fixed by Local Councils through Acuerdos. This group of taxes includes:
 Impuesto a ganadores de loterías: Tax on lottery winnings
 Impuesto a loterías foráneas: Tax on out-of-state lottery tickets
 Impuesto al consumo de cervezas, sifones y refajos: Tax on beer
 Impuesto al consumo de licores, vinos, aperitivos y similares: Tax on liquor
 Impuesto al consumo de cigarrillos: Tax on cigarettes
 Impuesto al consumo de gasolina: Tax on gasoline
 Degüello de ganado mayor: Tax on slaughterhouses
 Impuesto de registro: Tax to register academic degrees, patents, names, etc.
 Impuesto sobre vehículos automotores: Tax on automobiles
 Impuesto de industria y comercio: Tax on industrial, services or commercial establishments
The local council on each city fix the rate between this parameters:
 From 2 up to 7 per mil (0.2-0.7%) for industrial activities
 From 2 up to 10 per mil (0.2-1.0%) for commercial and services.
 Impuesto de avisos y tableros: Tax on advertising
 Impuesto predial: Property Tax

Tax Value Unit 
UVT (Unidad de Valor Tributario) means Tax Value Unit. Instead of setting a range in Colombian pesos, DIAN has the UVT value which represents a variable amount of pesos, and is updated at least every year. The next table shows the variation of this index in Colombia per year.

{| class="wikitable"
|-
! Year !! Value per UVT (colombian pesos) !! Variation !! Resolution
|-
| 2019 || 34,270  || 3,36% || 
|-
| 2018 || 33,156 || 4,07%  || 
|-
| 2017 || 31,859 || 7,08% ||
|-
| 2016 || 29,753 || 
|}

References

External links 
 Taxes in Colombia Official Investment Portal
  Impuestos en Colombia

 
Finance in Colombia